Mount Vernon Cemetery is a historic rural cemetery located at 3499 West Lehigh Avenue in the East Falls neighborhood of Philadelphia, Pennsylvania. It was established in 1856, is 27 acres in size and contains over 18,000 graves. It was neglected for decades by an absentee landlord. No plots have been sold since 1968, it was not open to the public, many graves fell into disrepair and the cemetery became heavily overgrown. In 2021, a Philadelphia judge ordered the cemetery be placed in conservatorship due to neglect.

History

The cemetery was established on February 28, 1856 and is located directly across Ridge Avenue from Laurel Hill Cemetery.

The property was originally part of the colonial estate of Robert Ralston named Mount Peace.  Another portion of the estate was purchased by the Oddfellows organization for Mount Peace Cemetery.

John Notman, the architect of Laurel Hill Cemetery's Italianate gatehouse was hired to design a larger and grander gatehouse for Mount Vernon Cemetery which was completed in 1858.

In 1864, the Gardel Memorial was added to Mount Vernon.  It is a memorial to Julia Hawks Gardel, the principal of a female seminary in Philadelphia, who died in 1859 while traveling in Syria.  Her husband, Bertrand Gardel, commissioned Belgian sculptor Guillaume Geefs to create a 25-foot pyramid made of sandstone, marble and imported granite.  The front of the pyramid is adorned with large marble statues which represent the continents of Asia, Europe and Africa to depict Julia's love of travel.  Two statues above the pyramid door depict Hope and Faith holding a carved relief of Julia.  The statue atop the pyramid represents America surrounded by emblems of the physical sciences. The memorial cost $36,000 which is the equivalent of about $2 million in current dollars.  Bertrand Gardel died in 1895 and is interred in the vault beneath the memorial with his wife.

In 1867, the Second Presbyterian Church burial ground on Arch Street was closed and 2,500 bodies were reinterred at Mount Vernon many from the 1700s including several Revolutionary War heroes.

The Drew family plot at Mount Vernon contains generations of the Barrymore family. The family lot was originally located in Glenwood Cemetery but was moved to Mount Vernon when Glenwood Cemetery was closed. John Barrymore left in his will that he wished to be buried in the Drew family plot but was originally interred in Calvary Cemetery in Los Angeles, California.  In 1980, his son John Drew Barrymore had his father's remains removed from the family mausoleum, cremated and reinterred in Mount Vernon Cemetery.  His grave was unmarked until 1992, when fans had a stone installed which had engraved upon it, "Alas poor Yorick" in a reference to his stage performance of Hamlet.

Ownership Change in 1973
Joseph Dinsmore Murphy, a lawyer from Washington D.C. began his ownership of the cemetery in 1973 when he inherited it from his father. The cemetery is not abandoned, however no plots have been sold since 1968 and it has become heavily overgrown.  Many graves have fallen into disrepair and some have been looted for scrap metal. Mount Vernon is not open to the public.  Murphy required an appointment to be made for visitations 24 hours in advance and only for people who had a family plot in the cemetery and know the location.

On May 1, 2020 the Philadelphia Development Coalition petitioned to be appointed conservator of the property due to its abandoned and neglected condition. 

In 2021 a Philadelphia judge ordered the cemetery be placed in conservatorship due to neglect.

Notable burials

 John Barrymore (1882–1942), stage, screen and radio actor
 Maurice Barrymore (1849–1905), stage actor
 George C. Burling (1834–1885), Union Army officer during the U.S. Civil War
 John Carson (1752–1794), physician
 Georgiana Drew (1856–1893), stage actress and comedian
 John Drew (1827–1862), stage actor and theatre manager
 John Drew, Jr. (1853–1927), stage actor
 Louisa Lane Drew (1820–1897), actress and theatre owner
 Louise Drew (1882–1954), stage actress
 Sidney Drew (1863–1913), member of the Mr. and Mrs. Sidney Drew comedy team
 Sidney Rankin Drew (1891–1918), actor and film director
 Peter Stephen Du Ponceau (1760–1844), linguist, philosopher and jurist
 Christian Febiger (1749–1796), American Revolutionary War commander
 Charles Albert Fechter (1824–1879), actor
 Charlie Householder (1854–1913), professional baseball player
 William Churchill Houston (1746–1788), New Jersey delegate to the Continental Congress
 William M. Ireland (? – 1891), one of the founders of the National Grange of the Order of Patrons of Husbandry
 Samuel Jaudon (1796–1874), banker and businessman
 Lawrence Johnson (1801–1860), printing stereotyper and type-founder
 Judy Lewis (1935–2011), actress, writer, producer and therapist
 Henry Myers (1858–1895), professional baseball player
 Horace Phillips (1853–1896), major league baseball manager
 Lawrence Saint (1885–1961), stained glass artist
 Maria Louise Sanford (1836–1920), educator
 Alfred J. Sellers (1836–1908), Medal of Honor recipient
 Bill Sharsig (1855–1902), Major League Baseball co-owner and general manager
 Jonathan Bayard Smith (1742–1812), Pennsylvania delegate to the Continental Congress
 John P. Van Leer (1834–1862), Union Army officer
 Jake Virtue (1865–1943), professional baseball player
 Pelatiah Webster (1726–1795), colonial merchant and author of short essays on finances and the government of the United States

References
Citations

Sources

External links

 Mt. Vernon Cemetery Conservation Company
 
 Philadelphia Community Development Coalition website
 Video of Mount Vernon Cemetery grounds uploaded April 24, 2016

1856 establishments in Pennsylvania
Cemeteries established in the 1850s
Cemeteries in Philadelphia
Mount Vernon
East Falls, Philadelphia
Rural cemeteries